The 1902 Colorado gubernatorial election was held on November 4, 1902. Republican nominee James Hamilton Peabody defeated Democratic nominee E. C. Stimson with 46.92% of the vote.

General election

Candidates
Major party candidates
James Hamilton Peabody, Republican
E. C. Stimson, Democratic

Other candidates
J. C. Provost, Socialist
Frank W. Owens, People's
Otto A. Reinhardt, Prohibition
J. A. Knight, Socialist Labor

Results

References

1902
Colorado
Gubernatorial